"Matchstalk Men and Matchstalk Cats and Dogs (Lowry's Song)" is a folk song by English duo Brian and Michael. It was released as their first single in late 1977 on Pye Records, and is from their 1978 debut album, The Matchstalk Men. The song reached number one on the UK Singles Chart for 3 weeks in April 1978. As the song is their only major hit, the duo remain as one-hit wonders in the UK, although one more single titled "Mama" briefly made the UK charts at No. 93 in 1983.

Lyrics and performance

"Matchstalk Men and Matchstalk Cats and Dogs" was a tribute to the artist L. S. Lowry, who had died in February 1976. The chorus makes reference to Lowry's style of painting human figures, which was similar to stick figure drawings (a "matchstalk" is a matchstick in Mancunian dialect).

For the song, Michael Coleman drew on his own memories of Salford and Ancoats as well as the paintings of Lowry. The song lyrics make reference to Lowry's painted scenes of bleak, industrial landscapes being initially unpopular, with the artist only finding fame in later life. According to the lyrics, now that Lowry's paintings hang in galleries among the world's great art, they are so revered that "even the Mona Lisa takes a bow". The song also makes reference to "sparking clogs"; clogs were a type of hard-wearing footwear popular in poor, industrial areas of northern England, and when scraped along cobbled streets, they would give off electric sparks.

St Winifred's School Choir appeared on the record, singing the children's song "The Big Ship Sails on the Alley-Alley-O", which was sung by children in the Salford area with reference to the Manchester Ship Canal.

Chart success and awards
The single spent three weeks at the top of the UK Singles Chart, with a total of 19 weeks on the chart. The B-side of the record is the track "The Old Rocking Chair". Coleman received the Ivor Novello award for 'The Outstanding Lyric of the Year'.

See also
List of UK Singles Chart number ones of the 1970s

References

1977 songs
1977 debut singles
English folk songs
UK Singles Chart number-one singles
Pye Records singles